Coleman Bridge may refer to:

George P. Coleman Memorial Bridge at Yorktown, Virginia
Coleman Bridge, Singapore
Coleman Bridge (Windsor, Massachusetts)